The Greer and Jennie Quay House is a historic house located in Jerome, Idaho.

Description and history
The house is ashlar masonry built of lava rock in 1911 and 1912 for brother and sister entrymen Greer and Jenny Quay. The peak of each shingled gable wall has a small square and diamond design leaded glass window. Square columns flanking the entrance remain but porch corner columns have been removed. Three double hung sash windows are set symmetrically on each side. These windows have cement flush lintels and projecting sills. The tops of the lintels are even with the top of the walls. Basement window lintels are large rectangular stones.

The Greer and Jennie Quay House was listed on the National Register of Historic Places on September 8, 1983, as part of a group of structures in south central Idaho built from local "lava rock".

See also
 Historic preservation
 National Register of Historic Places listings in Jerome County, Idaho
 Stonemasonry

References

External links
 

Houses completed in 1911
Houses in Jerome County, Idaho
Houses on the National Register of Historic Places in Idaho
National Register of Historic Places in Jerome County, Idaho